Aerenea quadriplagiata is a species of beetle in the family Cerambycidae. It was described by Boheman in 1859. It is known from Argentina, Brazil, Bolivia, Paraguay, and Uruguay.

References

Compsosomatini
Beetles described in 1859